Kaurialan kenttä is a multi-use stadium in Hämeenlinna, Finland. It is currently used mostly for football matches and is the home stadium of FC Hämeenlinna. The stadium holds 4,000 people.

External links
Venue information

Football venues in Finland
Buildings and structures in Kanta-Häme
1988 establishments in Finland
Sports venues completed in 1988
Sport in Hämeenlinna